El Mundo Se Equivoca (The World Is Mistaken) is the third studio album release from the Spanish music trio, La 5ª Estación. The album  received a Latin Grammy Award on November 8, 2007 for Best Pop Album by a Duo/Group with Vocals.

Content
It was released worldwide on August 22, 2006. It includes thirteen tracks and is the band's first album to be published under the dual disc format, containing on the video side, the behind the cameras of the album's recording.

In 2006, La 5ª Estación released "Tu Peor Error" (Your Worst Mistake) as the first single for the album. The single peaked in at number three in Mexico and in the top-twenty in the Billboard Hot Latin Tracks. "Me muero" (I'm Dying) was released as the second single from El mundo se equivoca, the song reached number ten in the Hot Latin Tracks chart. In Mexico the song topped the national singles chart for twelve weeks and it was succeeded by Eres para mi by Julieta Venegas. As of April 2007, the newest single released to Mexican radio is "Sueños rotos" (Broken Dreams), the song debuted at number ninety-three on May 7, 2007.

Track listing

Singles

Charts and certifications

Charts

Certifications

References

2006 albums
La 5ª Estación albums
Latin Grammy Award for Best Pop Album by a Duo or Group with Vocals